WGTN (1400 AM) is a radio station broadcasting a classic country format, which is licensed to Georgetown, South Carolina, United States. The station was first licensed October 4, 1949. The station is currently owned by R.J. Stalvey. It previously featured programming from America's Radio News Network and CBS News. It aired Fox Sports Radio on weekends.

FM translator
The station programming is also heard on an FM translator, whose frequency is used in the branding of the format and logo.

Programming History
The previous format was talk. On November 5, 2018, WGTN changed formats from talk to country, branded as "Coast Country 107.5". On January 14, 2019, WGTN again changed formats, this time from country to adult top 40, branded as "107.5 Hits FM". Three weeks later that format moved to WXJY. Later in 2019, WGTN began simulcasting on WXJY. On January 1, 2020, WGTN once more changed formats from country to comedy, branded as "The Comedy Station", and ended the simulcast.

In December 2020, WGTN changed to oldies/adult standards from the 1940s to 1960s. On July 29, 2021, WGTN changed to classic country, branded as "Countryfied 107.5".

Previous logo

References

External links
WGTN 1400 AM 107.5 FM Facebook

GTN (AM)
Radio stations established in 1949
1949 establishments in South Carolina
Classic country radio stations in the United States